Michelbach is a borough (Ortsbezirk) of Marburg in Hesse.

References

External links 
 Official website 
 https://www.marburg.de/michelbach
 

Districts of Marburg
Marburg-Biedenkopf